Tokugawa Ieyasu's Clock (Japanese: 徳川家康の洋時計, Tokugawa Ieyasu no yōdokei) is a clock which was given to Shogun Tokugawa Ieyasu of Japan by King Philip III of Spain in 1611. Built in 1581, the clock is the oldest surviving clock in Japan and one of the few surviving clocks in the world of its era. Since Ieyasu's death, the clock has been stored at Kunōzan Tōshō-gū, and has since been designated as an Important Cultural Property with application to designate it as a National Treasure in Japan under consideration. A 2012 examination by the British Museum concluded that the clock is likely the only clock in the world of its era in which almost all of the internal parts remain as they were originally made.

History 
The clock is a gilt-bronze spring-loaded clock manufactured in Madrid, Spain, in 1581 by Hans de Evalo, a watchmaker in the service of the King of Spain. The clock utilizes the most advanced mechanical technology of the time.

On September 30, 1609, Philippine Governor Rodrigo de Vivero, 1st Count of Valle de Orizaba was on board a ship which was heading from the Philippines to Mexico (New Spain) when it was caught in a storm near Japan and drifted ashore in Onjuku in present-day Chiba Prefecture. Local villagers succeeded in rescuing 317 of the 373 sailors on board. Local divers are said to have rescued drowning sailors from the sea and revived them with body heat. The crew was later sheltered at the Ōtaki Castle and the Iwaida Grand Shrine at the discretion of Honda Tadatomo, lord of Ōtaki Castle.

Rodrigo de Vivero then met Tokugawa Hidetada in Edo and Tokugawa Ieyasu in Sunpu. Ieyasu ordered his diplomatic advisor Miura Anjin (William Adams) to build two Western-style ships and ordered Tanaka Shōsuke and 21 other Japanese to transport Vivero and his party to Mexico on these ships. The ships set sail from Uraga on June 13, 1610 and arrived in Mexico on October 23.

In May 1611, King Philip III of Spain and Luis de Velasco, 1st Marquess of Salinas del Río Pisuerga, the Viceroy of New Spain, dispatched Commander Sebastián Vizcaíno to Japan to thank Ieyasu for the rescue and to send the Japanese back. The group delivered souvenirs to Ieyasu as a thank-you for the rescue, including a Western-style clock.

Ieyasu liked the clock very much and displayed it in his room, but did not use it as a clock because it differed from the Japanese calendar system.

The clock was never used or its parts replaced, and it was stored as a sacred treasure at Kunōzan Tōshō-gū in present-day Shizuoka, Shizuoka Prefecture after Ieyasu's death in 1616. In 1979, it was designated as an Important Cultural Property along with other Ieyasu's personal items as one of the "Materials Related to Tokugawa Ieyasu", and is currently on permanent display at the Kunōzan Tōshō-gū Museum.

Design 
The clock has a gilt bronze box with a domed top and doors on the left and right sides. The doors and back are engraved with lines depicting a view of a fortress from an arched gate, and the domed upper surface is overlaid with openwork metal fittings in a wave pattern. The circular dial on the front is gilt brass with an integrated silver scale ring.

Examination by the British Museum 
David Thompson, curator of horological collections at the British Museum in the United Kingdom, came to Japan to examine the internal parts of the clock in May 2012. Thompson stated at a press conference that "There are only about 20 similar clocks from this period in existence in the world, and almost all of the internal mainsprings and other parts remain unchanged, including the leather-covered outer case, which is in excellent condition." He also concluded that the clock is likely the only clock in the world of its era in which almost all of the internal parts remain as they were originally made, and that the clock is "extremely rare and valuable."

References 

Clocks in Japan
Important Cultural Properties of Japan
Japan–Spain relations
History of Shizuoka Prefecture